Yatawatta is a suburb of Matale, Sri Lanka. It is located in Matale District, Central Province, Sri Lanka.

Villages located in Yatawatta
Maligatenna

See also
List of towns in Central Province, Sri Lanka

External links

Populated places in Matale District